cis,cis-1,3,5-Triaminocyclohexane is an organic compound with the formula (CH2CHNH2)3.  It is a triamine. Of the many isomers possible for triaminocyclohexane, the cis,cis-1,3,5-derivative has attracted attention because it is a common tripodal ligand, abbreviated as tach.  It is a colorless oil.  It is a popular tridentate ligand in coordination chemistry.

It is prepared from the triscarbamate of cyclohexane. The latter is generated via the Curtius rearrangement starting from cyclohexanetricarboxylic acid.

Related ligands
Tris(aminomethyl)ethane, another tripodal triamine (CH3C(CH2NH2]3)

References

Tripodal ligands
Polyamines